Aynor is a small town in Horry County, South Carolina, United States, south of Galivants Ferry. The population was 560 at the 2010 census and estimated in 2018 to be 934. Aynor High School consistently ranks as one of the best schools in Horry County and South Carolina.

Geography

History
Aynor was settled as the Eyknor's Farm in the mid-19th century under Jacob Eyknor. After a railway terminus was added along the railroad from Conway, the town was incorporated in 1913. It elected a mayor and town wardens (now town council members). Gabriel Edwards (1849-1938) was elected the first mayor in 1913 and again in 1923 for a non-consecutive second term. The town developed as a center for production of turpentine, tobacco, and cotton as commodity crops.

Demographics

2020 census

As of the 2020 United States census, there were 974 people, 298 households, and 232 families residing in the town.

2010 census
As of the census of 2010, there were 560 people, 228 households, and 158 families residing in the town. The population density was 533.3 people per square mile (206.0/km2). There were 257 housing units at an average density of 233.5 per square mile (90.2/km2). The racial makeup of the town was 86.20% White, 11.75% African American, 0.51% Native American, 1.19% from other races, and 0.34% from two or more races. Hispanic or Latino of any race were 1.53% of the population.

There were 228 households, out of which 30.3% had children under the age of 18 living with them, 50.0% were married couples living together, 14.9% had a female householder with no husband present, and 30.7% were non-families. 28.5% of all households were made up of individuals, and 14.5% had someone living alone who was 65 years of age or older. The average household size was 2.57 and the average family size was 3.12.

In the town, the population was spread out, with 26.7% under the age of 18, 8.9% from 18 to 24, 28.8% from 25 to 44, 20.3% from 45 to 64, and 15.3% who were 65 years of age or older. The median age was 36 years. For every 100 females, there were 86.3 males. For every 100 females age 18 and over, there were 77.7 males.

The median income for a household in the town was $29,583, and the median income for a family was $35,417. Males had a median income of $30,781 versus $22,500 for females. The per capita income for the town was $16,076. About 13.1% of families and 19.6% of the population were below the poverty line, including 25.3% of those under age 18 and 15.4% of those age 65 or over.

Government 
The town is run by a Mayor-council government system. John Gardner is the current mayor of Aynor.

Aynor is also home to the tribal office of the Waccamaw people.

Economy
In 2013, PTR Industries relocated to the Cool Springs Business Park near Aynor from Bristol, Connecticut after that state passed restrictive gun control legislation following the murders of 20 children and six adult staff by a mentally ill man in the Sandy Hook Elementary School shooting. Twenty-one employees are relocating from Bristol. The company said that it will hire an additional 30 workers within the first quarter of 2014, with a goal of having 120 employees in 2017.

Education
Public education in Aynor is administered by Horry County Schools. The district operates Aynor High School.

Aynor has a public library, a branch of the Horry County Memorial Library.

References

External links
 
  Horry County Schools

Towns in Horry County, South Carolina
Towns in South Carolina